Joe Miller Field at Cowgirl Diamond is the home stadium for the Division I (NCAA) McNeese State Cowgirls softball team. Located on the campus of McNeese State University in Lake Charles, Louisiana, the stadium has a 1,200 seating capacity.  Seating consists of partially covered bleacher seating.  The stadium has field lighting, bullpens, dugouts, and a press box.  An indoor training facility, the "H.I.T" or House of Indoor Training, located outside the right field fence, allows hitting practice in all weather conditions.  A Daktronics electronic scoreboard includes a message board.  The initial home game was played on March 14, 2003, against the Southern Miss Golden Eagles softball team.

Adjacent to the stadium is the Hodges Street Fieldhouse, a 5,400 sq ft building opened on June 18, 2008, which services both the softball and soccer programs.  The building houses coaches offices; separate locker rooms for soccer and softball; a shared training room; and a conference room.

The 2009, 2016, and 2018 Southland Conference softball tournaments were played at Cowgirl Diamond. In 2016 and 2018 the host McNeese Cowgirls won the tournament.

Attendance

Below is a list of Cowgirl Diamond's 10 best-attended games.

As of the 2018 season.

References

External links
 McNeese State Cowgirls Softball Official Website

McNeese Cowgirls softball
College softball venues in the United States
Sports venues in Lake Charles, Louisiana
Softball venues in Louisiana
2003 establishments in Louisiana
Sports venues completed in 2003